Laudato TV is a Croatian local television station based in Zagreb (with studio in Split also). Television started its broadcasting at Christmas 2015. It was the most-viewed local television in Croatia in 2019.

It collaborates with EWTN and other Christian televisions.

See also 
Catholic television
Catholic television channels
Catholic television networks

References

External links 
 Official page
 Video archive
 Web portal laudato.hr
 Official You Tube channel

Television channels and stations established in 2015
Mass media in Zagreb
Television channels in Croatia
2015 establishments in Croatia
Catholic television channels